Russel Ray Ingels (August 28, 1890 - May 12, 1958) served in the California State Assembly for the 6th district from 1929 to 1931 and California State Senate for the 4th district from 1931 to 1935. During World War I he served in the United States Army. He later became a state senator.

References

United States Army personnel of World War I
Republican Party California state senators
Republican Party members of the California State Assembly
20th-century American politicians
1890 births
1958 deaths